Bugs Bunny's 3rd Movie: 1001 Rabbit Tales is a 1982 animated anthology comedy film directed by Friz Freleng with a compilation of Warner Bros. cartoon shorts (many of which have been abridged) and animated bridging sequences with Bugs Bunny as the story host.

Plot 
Bugs Bunny and Daffy Duck have to sell books for Rambling House. They go their separate ways and experience many wacky things. For instance, while flying through a winter storm, Daffy runs into a house owned by Porky Pig and briefly stays there while taking place of a stuffed duck which he merely destroyed. Meanwhile, Bugs burrows his way to a jungle where he pretends to be a baby ape to an ape couple. One half of the couple wants to do Bugs in, but manages to divert him after he accidentally drops a boulder on his wife's head.

After a little while, Bugs and Daffy reunite and burrow their way to a cave at a dry desert. Inside are treasures consisting of gold, jewels and stuff. The greedy duck tries to take the treasure, but he runs into Hassan the guard and makes a mad dash back to Bugs who tricks Hassan into climbing into the clouds. Daffy runs back into the cave in excitement.

Later, Bugs comes across Sultan Yosemite Sam's palace in the Arabian desert. Sam needs someone to read a series of stories to his spoiled brat son, Prince Abba-Dabba. When Bugs first meets the tyke and gets mocked, he objects to the idea of reading to him. Then, Sam threatens to make Bugs bathe in boiling oil, at which point Bugs agrees to read to Abba-Dabba, in which he reads him parodies of Jack & The Beanstalk, Goldilocks & The Three Bears, Hansel & Gretel, Little Red Riding Hood & The Pied Piper Of Hamelin (this part also includes Mexican Boarders). At one point, he tells him the story of the singing frog. Bugs tries to escape in a variety of ways but to no avail. At one point, Bugs even escapes on a flying carpet from the palace, but Sam catches him.

Meanwhile, Daffy tries to make off with the treasure. As he finishes with it, he makes a quick check to see if he missed anything when he encounters a magic lamp. Initially he rubs the lamp thinking that with a little spit and polish, it would bring a few more bucks but it instead releases a genie whom Daffy pushes him back down thinking he was trying to steal the treasure. But the genie does not like what he is doing and chases him out of the cave by casting dangerous spells on him. Daffy then wanders through the desert in a desperate search for water.

Back at the palace, Bugs is fed up with reading stories to the prince, so he dumps his book in the fire. As he is being threatened to be dunked in boiling oil, Bugs warns Sam not to throw him in a nearby hole which Sam eventually does as a trick. Little do Sam and Abba-Dabba realize that this is Bugs' ticket to freedom. So Bugs luckily escapes and ran into Daffy. Daffy is pleased to see Bugs and soon sees the palace, hoping to sell books there. Bugs tries to warn Daffy about the palace, but he doesn't listen. He finds out the hard way and the two walk off into the sunset with Daffy missing all of his feathers as Daffy asks Bugs if he brought some suntan oil for him.

Included shorts 
 Cracked Quack (Daffy's line, "We'll just put it away in the storage for the winter", is replaced with, "Thermopolis will just have to wait")
 Apes of Wrath (Bugs' line, "So I'll be a monkey", is replaced with, "I'll sell books later", and the ending with Daffy being delivered as a baby to Bugs via stork is removed)
 Wise Quackers (The opening where Daffy is flying and crash-lands like a plane on a farm and encounters Elmer.)
 Ali Baba Bunny (ending to cartoon appears later on with Bugs removed, and Daffy does not shrink via the genie's magic)
 Tweety and the Beanstalk (Bugs narrates the closing events of the cartoon, which is shortened)
 Bewitched Bunny (alternate opening, ends abruptly after the prince takes his leave)
 Goldimouse and the Three Cats (Bugs overdubs the narrator's lines)
 Red Riding Hoodwinked (Bugs again narrates the opening)
 The Pied Piper of Guadalupe & Mexican Boarders (with the story starting in the middle of the former after Sylvester had learned to play the flute before shifting to the plot of the latter and going back to the ending of the former)
 One Froggy Evening (the ending is not shown)
 Aqua Duck (footage is mirrored and only shown up to the point where Daffy realizes a pool of water is a mirage)

Notes 
 Most of the rest of the movie consists of the stories played out as classic cartoons. Some of the classic cartoon shorts were abridged. In the One Froggy Evening sequence, the ending where the construction worker from 2056 finds Michigan J. Frog and makes off with him was cut, making it seem as if the cartoon ended with the construction worker from 1955 getting rid of the frog and running off.
 This was the first Looney Tunes compilation film to use a completely original story and treat the included cartoon shorts as part of the story, as opposed to having the characters introduce the cartoons.
 Early television airings (like the Disney Channel in the 1990s) of the film had one sequence that was cut from the original theatrical version of the film. It took place after Bugs finished reading the story of Goldimouse and the Three Cats to Prince Abba-Dabba, when he told the next story to Abba-Dabba, the "Wolf in Sheep's Clothing" which featured the 1962 Ralph Wolf and Sam Sheepdog cartoon A Sheep in the Deep.
 This was the first ever time Arthur Q. Bryan was credited as Elmer Fudd .

Voice cast 
 Mel Blanc - Bugs Bunny, Daffy Duck, Porky Pig, Yosemite Sam, Sylvester the Cat, Sylvester Jr., Speedy Gonzales, Tweety, Rover, Hassan, Hansel, Prince Charming, Big Bad Wolf, Genie, Beanstalk Giant, Elvis Gorilla, Stork (also archive footage)
 June Foray - Granny, Mother Gorilla, Goldimouse, Little Red Riding Hood
 Shepard Menken - Old Storyteller
 Lennie Weinrib - Prince Abba-Dabba
 Bea Benaderet - Witch Hazel, Gretel (archive footage)
 Arthur Q. Bryan - Elmer Fudd (archive footage)
 Tom Holland - Slowpoke Rodriguez (archive footage)
 William "Bill" Roberts - Michigan J. Frog (singing voice) (archive footage)

Production 
 The main plot point, setting up Bugs and Daffy as Scheherazade-like figures, is in itself similar to the 1959 short Hare-Abian Nights, which itself used considerable stock footage and also featured Yosemite Sam as the sultan.
 Another interesting aspect of this film is that many voice artists that were not credited in the original shorts are billed as "additional classic voices". For the first time, 23 years after his death, Arthur Q. Bryan finally receives credit on a Warner Bros. production, even if it does fail to credit him as the voice of Elmer Fudd.
 The film marks the first time that a Warner cartoon compilation feature used classic cartoon footage from more than one director. One Froggy Evening, Bewitched Bunny and Ali Baba Bunny were directed by Chuck Jones, and Aqua Duck was directed by Robert McKimson, while all other classic shorts included were directed by Friz Freleng.

Reception 
Carrie Rickey, reviewer for the Village Voice, remarked that Bugs and Daffy "used to be burrowers, explorers; now they're traveling salesmen imprisoned by the nuclear family."

Home media 
The film was released on VHS in 1983 by Warner Home Video, and is included along with The Bugs Bunny/Road Runner Movie on the 2005 Looney Tunes Movie Collection DVD set.

References

External links 

 
 
 

1982 films
1982 animated films
Looney Tunes films
Bugs Bunny films
Daffy Duck films
Porky Pig films
Animated anthology films
Films directed by Friz Freleng
Warner Bros. Animation animated films
Films based on One Thousand and One Nights
1980s American animated films
Films scored by Robert J. Walsh
Films set in the Arabian Peninsula
Films set in deserts
Films set in palaces
American children's animated adventure films
American children's animated fantasy films
Animated films about rabbits and hares
1980s children's animated films
American parody films
Fairy tale parody films
Films with screenplays by Michael Maltese
Yosemite Sam films
1980s English-language films